The 1986 Athens International was a men's tennis tournament played on outdoor clay courts in Athens in Greece that was part of the 1986 Nabisco Grand Prix. It was the inaugural edition and was held from 16 June until 23 June 1986. Henrik Sundström won the singles title.

Finals

Singles

 Henrik Sundström defeated  Francisco Maciel 6–0, 7–5
 It was Sundström's only title of the year and the 5th of his career.

Doubles

 Libor Pimek /  Blaine Willenborg defeated  Carlos di Laura /  Claudio Panatta 5–7, 6–4, 6–2
 It was Pimek's 2nd title of the year and the 6th of his career. It was Willenborg's only title of the year and the 5th of his career.

See also
 1986 Athens Trophy – women's tournament

References

External links
 ITF tournament edition details

Athens Open
Athens Open
ATP Athens Open
June 1986 sports events in Europe